The Diocesan Shrine of the Immaculate Conception Church, also known as Naic Church, is a Roman Catholic church located in the municipality of Naic in Cavite, Philippines. It was constructed during the 1800s. When the friars discovered that the land at Naic was fertile, they became interested in settling there. It eventually led them to build the administration building of Casa Hacienda, presently occupied by the Naic Central School. Casa Hacienda de Naic is the only casa hacienda administered by friars in the Philippines that is still in use.

History

It has been believed that the original location of the Naic's poblacion was at the western side of the present site of the town. It was near a bridge constructed during the time of Rev. Fr. Juan Matavacas, O.P. The change of location of the poblacion happened on 1798 during the administration of Don Miguel de la Cruz, the first acting-monsignor of the town. The parish was established on 1796 and was headed by Pedro Antonio de Escuza.

Parish priests of Naic

Architectural history

The church, constructed during the 1800, was made up of wood and cogon grass. Later additions of the church, such as kopa, a pair of cruets, and ornamentation, were added six years after its initial construction. On 1835, the construction of a new stone church was administered by Don Pedro Florentino. Its construction resulted to influx of people - from 18 barrios, or neighborhood in 1845 to 26 barrios in 1867.  It reached up to 54 barrios in 1888.

During the revolutionary period, the church convent of Naic was used as the headquarters of Andres Bonifacio after the Tejeros Convention of March 22, 1897. The Naic conference was held at the church convent. It was in this conference that the old Tagalog letter of the flag was replaced by a "Sun of Liberty" with the symbolic eight rays. The sun was shown with teo eyes, a nose and a mouth.

Architectural features

The present church was built in the 17th century. Before the World War II, the Naic Church was built along the semi-gothic architecture. It was one of the tallest (about five storeys high) and the longest (almost ten blocks long) in the province of Cavite. It was second to the Imus Cathedral in width. Three major altars and two minor altars were founded in its interior. The Very Venerated Image of the Immaculate Concepcion, Patron Lady of Naic, was located in the main altar.

References

External links

Roman Catholic churches in Cavite
Churches in the Roman Catholic Diocese of Imus